Sunrise Sports Club is a cricket ground in Harare, Zimbabwe. The ground is bordered to the north and east by housing and to the west and south by open ground. First-class cricket was first played there in August 1998 when the Zimbabwe Cricket Union President's XI played the South Africa Academy, resulting in a six wicket victory for the President's XI. In October of that same year the ground held a second first-class fixture, with the President's XI playing the touring Indians, which the tourists won by an innings and 71 runs. The ground was scheduled to host a first-class match the following season in the 1998–99 Logan Cup between Mashonaland and Mashonaland A, however the match was abandoned without a ball bowled. India later played a one-day warm-up match at the ground against Zimbabwe A during their 2001 tour.

See also
List of cricket grounds in Zimbabwe

References

External links
Sunrise Sports Club at CricketArchive
Sunrise Sports Club at ESPNcricinfo

Cricket grounds in Zimbabwe
Buildings and structures in Harare